The Jose Eusebio Boronda Adobe is a Monterey Colonial style building from 1846, located in Salinas, Monterey County, California. It is listed on the National Register of Historic Places in 1973, and is a California Historical Landmark.

History

The Boronda Adobe is a Spanish Colonial adobe, with a wood-shingled roof, wrap-around porches, open beamed ceilings, and two indoor fireplaces. It was built by José Eusebio Boronda (1808-1880) between 1844 and 1848. The adobe is located on Boronda Road, northwest of Salinas. Boronda who was the grantee of Rancho Rincon de Sanjon, a  Mexican land grant in present-day Monterey County, California given in 1840 by Governor Juan B. Alvarado to José Eusebio Boronda. 

Boronda is the third son of Captain José Manuel Boronda (1750-1826) and Maria Gertrudis Higuera (1776-1851). His brother, José Manuel Boronda, was the first settler in Carmel Valley, California and was granted the  Rancho Los Laureles Mexican land grant in present-day Monterey County, California on September 20, 1839, by Governor Juan Alvarado.

In about 1887, the family members of William Anderson and Ines Boronda de Anderson, daughter of José Eusebio Boronda were living in the adobe. In the 1920s, Ygnacio Boronda (Eusebio’s grandson) and his family was the last Borondas to live in the adobe. In 1929, the adobe property was sold to Charles Brooks who built his home behind the adobe.

Boronda History Center

The Monterey County Historical Society acquired the Boronda Adobe in December 1972, from Marguerite (Earl) Wilson. The adobe has been restored and made into a museum in 1976. Today it operates as part of the Boronda History Center.

Gallery

See also
Ranchos of California
List of Ranchos of California

References

External links

 Monterey County Historical Society

History of Monterey County, California
Adobe buildings and structures in California
Houses completed in 1846
Houses on the National Register of Historic Places in California
Houses on the National Register of Historic Places in Monterey County, California
Houses in Monterey County, California
California Historical Landmarks
Spanish Colonial architecture in California
Museums in Monterey County, California
History museums in California
Buildings and structures in Salinas, California
National Register of Historic Places in Monterey County, California